Rasmus Højgaard (born 12 March 2001) is a Danish professional golfer who won his first European Tour event at the 2019 AfrAsia Bank Mauritius Open, becoming the third youngest player to win on the European Tour.

Amateur career

Højgaard first came to prominence in July 2016 when he won the Danish International Amateur Championship, was part of the Danish team that finished third in the European Boys' Team Championship and won the McGregor Trophy in successive weeks. In 2017 Højgaard received further recognition at the boys level by representing Continental Europe in the Jacques Léglise Trophy. He was also part of the Danish team that won the 2017 European Boys Team Championship, beating the hosts Spain in the final.

Early in 2018 Højgaard played for Europe in the Bonallack Trophy against Asia/Pacific. In June he won the individual competition for the boys Toyota Junior Golf World Cup, four strokes ahead of his brother Nicolai. Denmark also won the team competition. In September he was part of the Danish team that won the 2018 Eisenhower Trophy for the first time and he played for Europe in the Junior Ryder Cup later in the month.

Professional career
Højgaard turned professional at the start of 2019. After playing some tournaments on the Nordic Golf League he played on the Challenge Tour for the rest of the season. He was one of five runners-up in his first Challenge Tour event, the Challenge de España. Although he had a number of further top-10 finishes, he finished 21st in the Order of Merit, missing out on a place on the 2020 European Tour. However he finished tied for 5th place in the Q School later in 2019 to gain a place on the tour.

In December 2019, Højgaard won the AfrAsia Bank Mauritius Open, the second event of the season, winning a three-man playoff against Renato Paratore and Antoine Rozner at the third extra hole.

Højgaard was the first player born in the 2000s to win on the European Tour. He won in only his fifth European Tour start and became the third youngest winner in Tour history, behind Matteo Manassero and Danny Lee.

In August 2020, Højgaard won the ISPS Handa UK Championship in a playoff over Justin Walters for his second European Tour win. He became the second youngest player to achieve multiple wins on the Tour, after Matteo Manassero.

In August 2021, Højgaard won the Omega European Masters in Switzerland. He shot a final-round 63 to post −13 and the clubhouse lead. Bernd Wiesberger who was leading by one shot at the time, double-bogeyed the final hole to finish one behind Højgaard.

Personal life
Højgaard's twin brother Nicolai is a professional golfer and was also part of the Danish team that won the 2018 Eisenhower Trophy. They became the first brothers to win in back-to-back weeks on the European Tour in 2021.

Amateur wins
2015 Aon Junior Tour Drenge 1
2016 Danish International Amateur Championship, McGregor Trophy, DGU Elite Tour III Drenge
2017 Hovborg Kro Open, KGC Masters
2018 Toyota Junior Golf World Cup

Source:

Professional wins (3)

European Tour wins (3)

1Co-sanctioned by the Asian Tour and the Sunshine Tour

European Tour playoff record (2–0)

Results in major championships
Results not in chronological order in 2020.

CUT = missed the half-way cut

NT = No tournament due to COVID-19 pandemic

Results in World Golf Championships

1Cancelled due to COVID-19 pandemic

NT = No tournament

Team appearances
Amateur
European Boys' Team Championship (representing Denmark): 2016, 2017 (winners)
Jacques Léglise Trophy (representing the Continent of Europe): 2017 (winners)
Bonallack Trophy (representing Europe): 2018
European Amateur Team Championship (representing Denmark): 2018
Junior Ryder Cup (representing Europe): 2018
Eisenhower Trophy (representing Denmark): 2018 (winner)

See also
2019 European Tour Qualifying School graduates

References

External links

Danish male golfers
European Tour golfers
Olympic golfers of Denmark
Golfers at the 2020 Summer Olympics
Danish twins
Twin sportspeople
Sportspeople from the Region of Southern Denmark
People from Billund Municipality
2001 births
Living people